Kévin Aymoz (born 1 August 1997) is a French figure skater. He is the 2019 Grand Prix Final bronze medalist, 2019 Internationaux de France bronze medalist, the 2019 NHK Trophy silver medalist, the 2022 Grand Prix of Espoo bronze medalist, the 2022 Challenger Series Champion and has placed as high as 4th at the European Championships. He is a five-time French national champion (2017, 2019–2022).

Career

Early years 
Aymoz began learning to skate in 2003. He became the French national junior bronze medalist in the 2012–2013 season and repeated the following season.

2014–2015 season: Senior international debut
Aymoz started the 2014–2015 season on the junior level, winning gold at the Lombardia Trophy and bronze at the International Cup of Nice. Making his senior international debut, he finished eighth at the 2014 NRW Trophy at the end of November. He placed fifth on the senior level at the French Championships, held in December, before winning the national junior title in February 2015. Aymoz ended his season with a senior international medal, silver at the Coupe du Printemps in March.

2015–2016 season: Junior Grand Prix debut
Early in the season, Aymoz was coached by Véronique Cartau, Bernard Glesser, and Jean-François Ballester in Grenoble. His ISU Junior Grand Prix debut came in late August 2015; he placed fourth at his sole assignment, in Riga, Latvia. After winning the senior bronze medal at the Lombardia Trophy in September, he made his first appearances on the ISU Challenger Series (CS), placing seventh at the 2015 CS Tallinn Trophy in November and twelfth at the 2015 CS Golden Spin of Zagreb in December.

In February 2016, Aymoz won his second French national junior title. In March, he represented France at the 2016 World Junior Championships in Debrecen, Hungary; he qualified for the free skate by placing fifth in the short program. He finished ninth overall after placing eleventh in the free skating. By the end of the season, he was training in both Grenoble and Annecy, overseen by Cartau, Didier Lucine, Claudine Lucine, and Sophie Golaz.

2016–2017 season: First national title 
In the first half of the season, Aymoz was coached by Didier Lucine, Sophie Golaz, and Véronique Cartau in Annecy. In December 2016, he won the French national title. On 16 January 2017, the FFSG reported that Aymoz had decided to return to Grenoble and that the federation had sent Katia Krier for the intermediary period. He placed fifteenth at the 2017 European Championships in Ostrava, Czech Republic.

2017–2018 season 
During the season, Aymoz trained with Katia Krier in Paris and with John Zimmerman in Tampa, Florida. He took gold at the Denkova-Staviski Cup and finished tenth at his debut Grand Prix event, the 2017 Internationaux de France. His season ended after he finished second to Chafik Besseghier at the French Championships.

2018–2019 season: Second national title 
At his first event of the season, the 2018 CS Autumn Classic International, Aymoz placed eighth in the short, third in the free, and fifth overall.

Aymoz received two Grand Prix assignments, the 2018 Skate Canada International and 2018 Internationaux de France. He placed seventh and fifth, respectively. At the year's close, Aymoz won his second French national title.

At the 2019 European Championships, Aymoz placed fourth in both the short program and free skate, finishing fourth overall, and only 0.74 points behind bronze medalist Matteo Rizzo of Italy. At the 2019 World Championships in Saitama, Japan, he placed eleventh, setting a new personal best in the short program and total score.

2019–2020 season: Grand Prix Final bronze 

Aymoz again began his season on the Challenger series at the 2019 CS Autumn Classic International, where he won the silver medal with second-place finishes in both segments.  Aymoz landed two quads in a free skate for the first time.

On the Grand Prix, Aymoz competed first at the 2019 Internationaux de France, where a fall on his combination attempt in the short program left him in third place, distantly behind Nathan Chen and Alexander Samarin but only a few points ahead of Shoma Uno.  He placed second in the free skate, behind Chen, winning the bronze medal overall.  Aymoz then continued this successful streak by winning silver at the following NHK Trophy and thereby qualifying for the Grand Prix Final.  He was second in the short program behind Yuzuru Hanyu, making only a small error on his quad toe loop, and third in the free skate behind Hanyu and Roman Sadovsky.  Competing at the Final, Aymoz placed third in the short program, skating cleanly despite a musical mishap that initially played the music of competitor Dmitri Aliev.  Third in the free skate as well with only one error with a fall on an underrotated quad toe, he won the bronze medal, the first Frenchman to medal at the Final since Brian Joubert in 2006.

After winning the French national title again, Aymoz headed into the 2020 European Championships as one of the favourites to take the title.  However, in what commentators dubbed "a day to forget" for the skater, all three of his jumping passes failed in the short program.  He placed twenty-sixth in that segment, failing to qualify for the free skate, to the "shock" of much of the audience.  This proved to be Aymoz's final competition for the season, as the World Championships in Montreal were cancelled as a result of the coronavirus pandemic.

2020–2021 season 
With the pandemic continuing to affect international travel, the ISU opted to assign the Grand Prix based mainly on geographic location, with Aymoz being assigned to the 2020 Internationaux de France. However, this event was subsequently cancelled. In February, Aymoz won his fourth national title. On 1 March, he was named to the team for the 2021 World Championships.

Competing in Stockholm, Aymoz placed ninth in the short program. Ninth in the free skate as well; he held ninth place overall. Aymoz's result qualified one men's berth for France at the 2022 Winter Olympics, and the possibility of a second to be earned later. He was subsequently announced as part of the French team for the 2021 World Team Trophy. On 8 April, he was named as team captain.  Aymoz placed fourth in both the short program and the free skate, while Team France finished in fifth place.

2021–2022 season: Beijing Olympics 
Aymoz recruited hip hop choreographer Mehdi Kerkouche to work on his programs for the new season, seeing someone from outside the skating world bring an "unexpected" perspective. Due to a case of athletic pubalgia, he was unable to practice on ice for two months, resuming training three weeks before Master's de Patinage, where he attempted less than his normal technical difficulty and won the bronze medal. He subsequently attempted to compete at the 2021 Skate America but withdrew after falling on all three jumping passes in the short program, citing his injury. He was ninth at the 2021 Internationaux de France, skating with reduced technical content. 

After winning the French national title, Aymoz was named to the French Olympic team. Competing at the 2022 European Championships, he was tenth in the short program but rose to fourth in the free skate, finishing seventh overall.

Competing at the 2022 Winter Olympics, Aymoz placed tenth in the short program of the men's event, despite tripling a planned quad Salchow jump. Jump errors in the free skate saw him rank fifteenth in that segment, but he finished twelfth overall. He was eleventh at the 2022 World Championships to conclude the season.

2022–2023 season: New Olympic cycle 
After a difficult Olympic season, Aymoz contemplated whether he had the desire to continue for another four years to the 2026 Winter Olympics. He said he "took a summer break–reading books and watching TV shows. And then I was like: Okay, I'm ready to go again." For his free program for the season, he drew inspiration from Madeline Miller's novel The Song of Achilles, about the relationship between Achilles and Patroclus. Using primarily music from Gladiator, he explained, "my story is not about gladiators, but the music touches my heart, and it's the story of two people fighting for love."

Aymoz began the new season in September at the 2022 CS U.S. Classic. After winning the short program, placing ahead of American rising star Ilia Malinin, he finished second in the free skate and overall. He then traveled to France to compete at the Master's de Patinage but sustained an ankle injury while there and had to withdraw from the 2022 Grand Prix de France. After six weeks of recovery, he came back tow in his first Challenger gold medal at the 2022 CS Warsaw Cup, beating European silver medalist Daniel Grassl. The following week at 2022 Grand Prix of Espoo, he again won the short program over Malinin, despite not yet attempting any quad jumps post-injury. He was third in the free skate and won the bronze medal overall, a result of which he said he was "really proud."

At the French championships, Aymoz finished second behind Adam Siao Him Fa. He then competed at the 2023 European Championships, coming fourth in the short program after singling his triple Axel attempt. He was fourth in the free skate as well, and finished fourth overall, 7.09 points behind Swiss bronze medalist Lukas Britschgi.

Personal life 
Aymoz is openly gay and was among the six French LGBT athletes featured in the documentary We Need to Talk.

Awards 
Kevin Aymoz has been nominated two times to the new ISU Skating Award.

Programs

Competitive highlights 
GP: Grand Prix; CS: Challenger Series; JGP: Junior Grand Prix

Detailed results
Small medals for short and free programs awarded only at ISU Championships. At team events, medals awarded for team results only. ISU personal bests highlighted in bold. Historic ISU personal bests highlighted in bold and italicized.

Senior career

Junior level

References

External links 
 

1997 births
French male single skaters
Living people
People from Échirolles
Sportspeople from Isère
French LGBT sportspeople
LGBT figure skaters
Gay sportsmen
Figure skaters at the 2022 Winter Olympics
Olympic figure skaters of France
21st-century French people